Bijay is a given name. Notable people with this name include:

Bijay Biswaal (born 1964), Indian painter
Bijay Chand Mahtab (1881–1941), Maharaja of Bardhaman
Bijay Chhetri (born 2001), Indian footballer
Bijay Kumar Gachhadar (born 1954), Nepali politician
Bijay Mishra (1936–2020), Indian playwright
Bijay Mohanty (1950–2020), Indian actor
Bijay Singh, Indian politician
Bijay Subba (born 1994), Indian cricketer
Bijay Subba (politician) (born 1957), Nepali politician
Bijay Subedi, Nepali politician

See also

Vijay (disambiguation)
B. J. (given name)